Lithuanian Jews is a branch of Judaism traced to the Jews from the 18th century Grand Duchy of Lithuania.

Litvish may also refer to:

Litvish,  a Yiddish dialect characteristic of Lithuanian Jews, also known as Northeastern Yiddish
Litvishe, non-Hasidic Haredi Jews
Litvak, any Jew from Lithuania; see History of the Jews in Lithuania
Mags and snags 

Yiddish words and phrases